Pentrellwyn is a small village in the community of Llandysul, Ceredigion, Wales. Pentrellwyn is represented in the Senedd by Elin Jones (Plaid Cymru) and is part of the Ceredigion constituency in the House of Commons.

References 

Villages in Ceredigion
Llandysul